William Lester Self Andrews is an American chemist who makes contributions to the ongoing development of quantum chemistry of metallic complexes. He is the Professor Emeritus of Chemistry at the University of Virginia. He won the Earle K. Plyler Prize for Molecular Spectroscopy in 2010 for "vibrational spectroscopy in cryogenic matrices that combined with quantum calculations, has led to the identification and characterization of many molecules, ions, and complexes across the periodic table".

He was born in Lincolnton, North Carolina.  His first degree was in chemical engineering at Mississippi State University in 1963 and his doctorate was in physical chemistry at Berkeley in 1966.

References

External links 

 List of publications — 818 papers from 1966 to 2013
 University of Virginia — profile

20th-century chemists
American physical chemists
Spectroscopists
1942 births
Living people
People from Lincolnton, North Carolina
Mississippi State University alumni
UC Berkeley College of Chemistry alumni
University of Virginia faculty
20th-century American chemists